Win City (foaled 1998 in Ontario) is a retired Canadian Champion Thoroughbred racehorse. The grandson of U.S. Triple Crown champion, Seattle Slew, he was bred for a $5,000 stud fee by the father and son team of Frank Digiulio, Sr. and Jr. who owned his mare, Winsfordan.

In 2001, Win City won six important stakes races. He ran second to Dancethruthedawn in the Queen's Plate then the two horses reversed their positions in the second leg of the Canadian Triple Crown, the Prince of Wales Stakes. His 2001 performances earned Win City the Sovereign Award for Champion 3-Year-Old Male Horse and Canadian Horse of the Year honours.

Sent to the track in 2002, four-year-old Win City was winless in seven starts.

References
 Win City's pedigree and partial racing stats
 The Win City in Vietnam

1998 racehorse births
Racehorses bred in Canada
Racehorses trained in Canada
Canadian Thoroughbred Horse of the Year
Thoroughbred family 2-e